Il bello delle donne (Beauty of Women) is an Italian comedy-drama television series.
The story is about the lives of different Italian women.

Main cast

Stefania Sandrelli: Anna Borsi
Nancy Brilli: Vicky Melzi (1ª e 3ª Seasons)
Giuliana De Sio: Annalisa Bottelli Renzi Di Balsano
Lunetta Savino: Agnese Astuti Borsi (1ª e 2ª Seasons)
Antonella Ponziani: Francesca Cialdi
Caterina Vertova: Olga Astuti De Contris (1ª Season)
Virna Lisi: Contessa Miranda Spadoni
Eva Grimaldi: Elfride De Contris
Nicole Grimaudo: Tina  (1ª Season)
Gabriel Garko: Roberto Bobo De Contris
Massimo Bellinzoni: Luca Manfridi
Manuela Arcuri:  (4ª Season)
Urbano Barberini: Andrè Renzi
Damiano Andriano: Felicetto
Stefano Davanzati: Alfio Barba
Pier Maria Cecchini: Cirino Borsi (1ª e 2ª Seasons)
Maria Michela Mari: Palma Colombo-Verdesca  
Felice Andreasi: Giovanni Cozza
Pier Paolo Capponi: Conte Pietro Spadoni
Barbara Di Bartolo: Ludovica Spadoni
Philippe Caroit: Aldo
Fabio Fulco: Milko
Raffaele Buranelli: Giulio Trevi
Gippy Soprani: Clorinda Contegno
Elisabetta Rocchetti: Celeste
Antonio Giuliani: Gianni Bianco
Manuele Labate: Walter Bassetti
Ida Di Benedetto: Esmeralda De Santis
Maria Grazia Cucinotta: Rosy Fumo
Patricia Millardet: Angelina Brusa (2ª e 3ª Seasons)
Anita Ekberg: Ingrid
Eva Robin's: Pola 
Loredana Cannata: Elena Parodi
Ginevra Colonna: Irma Parodi
Martine Brochard: Baronessa Tonia Turati
Isabella Orsini: Saveria
Pino Micol: Otto Di Balsano
Daniele Pecci: Edoardo Di Balsano 
Cesare Bocci: Dario Di Balsano
Florence Guérin: Lilletta Di Balsano 
Pino Colizzi: Gabriele De Contris
Roberto Posse: Gualtiero Parodi
Emanuela Garuccio: Fanny
Georgia Luzi: Mavi
Vincenzo Peluso: Tony
Edoardo Leo: Ivan
Giusi Cataldo: Laura Del Bono
Michèle Mercier: Noemi Del Bono
Rossella Falk: Nina 
Francesca D'Aloja: Luna Tamberlani 
Francesca Nunzi: Fiorenza 
Laura Troschel: Myrtis Giovannelli

See also
List of Italian television series

External links
 

Italian television series
2001 Italian television series debuts
2003 Italian television series endings
2000s Italian television series
Canale 5 original programming